John Graves Simcoe (25 February 1752 – 26 October 1806) was a British Army general and the first lieutenant governor of Upper Canada from 1791 until 1796 in southern Ontario and the watersheds of Georgian Bay and Lake Superior. He founded York, which is now known as  Toronto, and was instrumental in introducing institutions such as courts of law, trial by jury, English common law, and freehold land tenure, and also in the abolition of slavery in Canada.

His long-term goal was the development of Upper Canada (Ontario) as a model community built on aristocratic and conservative principles, designed to demonstrate the superiority of those principles to the republicanism of the United States. His energetic efforts were only partially successful in establishing a local gentry, a thriving Church of England, and an anti-American coalition with select indigenous nations. He is seen by many Canadians as a founding figure in Canadian history, especially by those in Southern Ontario. He is commemorated in Toronto with Simcoe Day.

Early life 

Simcoe was the only surviving son of Cornishman John (1710–1759) and Katherine Simcoe (died 1767). His parents had four children, but he was the only one to live past childhood; Percy drowned in 1764, while Paulet William and John William died as infants. His father was a captain in the Royal Navy who commanded the 60-gun HMS Pembroke during the Siege of Louisbourg (1758), with James Cook as his sailing master. He died of pneumonia on 15 May 1759 on board his ship in the mouth of the Saint Lawrence River a few months prior to the siege of Quebec, and was buried at sea. The family then moved to his mother's parental home in Exeter. His paternal grandparents were William and Mary (née Hutchinson) Simcoe.

He was educated at Exeter Grammar School and Eton College. He spent a year at Merton College, Oxford; he was then admitted to Lincoln's Inn, but decided to follow the military career for which his father had intended him. He was initiated into Freemasonry in Union Lodge, Exeter on 2 November 1773.

Military career in American Revolutionary War 
In 1770, Simcoe entered the British Army as an ensign in the 35th Regiment of Foot, and his unit was dispatched to the Thirteen Colonies. Later, he saw action in the American Revolutionary War during the Siege of Boston. After the siege, in July 1776, he was promoted captain in the 40th Regiment of Foot. He saw action with the grenadier company of the 40th Foot in the New York and New Jersey campaign and the Philadelphia campaign. Simcoe commanded the 40th's Grenadiers at the Battle of Brandywine on 11 September 1777, where he was wounded. Legend has it that Simcoe ordered his men at Brandywine not to fire upon three fleeing rebels, among whom was George Washington.

In 1777, Simcoe sought to form a Loyalist regiment of free blacks from Boston but instead was offered the command of the Queen's Rangers formed on Staten Island on 15 October 1777. It was a well-trained light infantry unit comprising 11 companies of 30 men, 1 grenadier, and 1 hussar, and the rest light infantry. The Queen's Rangers saw extensive action during the Philadelphia campaign, including a successful surprise attack (planned and executed by Simcoe) at the Battle of Crooked Billet.

In 1778, Simcoe led an attack on Judge William Hancock's house during a foraging expedition opposed by Patriot militia. The attack killed 10 militiamen in their sleep and wounded five others. Hancock was also killed, although he was not with the Americans. The attack took place at night and with bayonets. On 28 June of that year, Simcoe and his Queen's Rangers took part in the Battle of Monmouth, in and near Freehold, New Jersey.

On 31 August 1778, Lieut. Col. Simcoe led a massacre of forty Native Americans, allied with the Continental Army, in what is today the Bronx, New York. This place is known as Indian Field in Van Cortlandt Park, Bronx, New York.

On 26 October 1779, Simcoe and 80 men launched an attack on central New Jersey from southern Staten Island known as Simcoe's Raid, from what is known today as the Conference House, resulting in the burning of Patriot supplies inside a Dutch Reformed Church in Finderne, including hay and grain; the release of Loyalist prisoners from the Somerset County Courthouse; and Simcoe's capture by Armand Tuffin de La Rouërie. Simcoe was released at the end of 1779 and rejoined his unit in Virginia. He participated in the Raid on Richmond with Benedict Arnold in January 1781 and was involved in a skirmish near Williamsburg and was at the Siege of Yorktown. He was invalided back to England in December of that year as a lieutenant-colonel, having been promoted in March 1782.

Simcoe wrote a book on his experiences with the Queen's Rangers, titled A Journal of the Operations of the Queen's Rangers from the end of the year 1777 to the conclusion of the late American War, which was published in 1787. He served briefly as Inspector General of Recruitment for the British Army, from 1789 until his departure for Upper Canada two years later.

Marriage and family
Simcoe convalesced at the Devon home of his godfather, Admiral Samuel Graves. In 1782, Simcoe married Elizabeth Posthuma Gwillim, his godfather's ward. Elizabeth was a wealthy heiress, who acquired a  estate at Honiton in Devon and built Wolford Lodge. Wolford was the Simcoe family seat until 1923.

The Simcoes had five daughters before their posting in Canada. Son Francis was born in 1791. Their Canadian-born daughter, Katherine, died in infancy in York. She is buried in the Victoria Square Memorial Park on Portland Avenue, Toronto. Francis returned with his father to England when his tenure expired and joined the army. He was killed in an infantry charge during the Peninsular War in 1812.

Son Henry Addington Simcoe became an English theologian.

Member of Parliament 
Simcoe entered politics in 1790. He was elected Member of Parliament for St Mawes in Cornwall, as a supporter of the government (led by William Pitt the Younger). As MP, he proposed raising a militia force like the Queen's Rangers. He also proposed to lead an invasion of Spain. But instead he was to be made lieutenant governor of the new loyalist province of Upper Canada. He resigned from Parliament in 1792 on taking up his new post.

Lieutenant Governor of Upper Canada 
The Constitutional Act 1791 divided Canada into the Provinces of Upper Canada (Ontario) and Lower Canada (Quebec). The Act established separate governments and legislative assemblies for each province. Lower Canada was the French-speaking eastern portion, which retained the French civil law and protections for the Roman Catholic Church established when Britain took over the area after its defeat of the French in the Seven Years' War. Upper Canada was the western area, newly settled after the American Revolutionary War. The settlers were mostly English speakers, including Loyalists from the Thirteen Colonies, and also the Six Nations of the Iroquois, who had been British allies during the war. The Crown had purchased land from the Mississauga and other First Nations to give the Loyalists land grants in partial compensation for property lost in the United States, and to help them set up new communities and develop this territory.

Simcoe was appointed Lieutenant-Governor on 12 September 1791, and left for Canada with his wife Elizabeth and daughter Sophia, leaving three daughters behind in England with their aunt. They left England in September and arrived in Canada on 11 November. Due to severe weather, the Simcoes spent the winter in Quebec City. Simcoe finally reached Kingston, Upper Canada, on 24 June 1792.

In a proclamation on 16 July 1792, he renamed several islands at the mouth of the archipelago at the head of the St. Lawrence river to commemorate the British generals of the Seven Years' War (Amherst Island,  
Carleton Island, Gage Island, Wolfe Island, and Howe Island).

Under the Constitutional Act, the provincial government consisted of the Lieutenant-Governor, an appointed Executive Council and Legislative Council, and an elected Legislative Assembly. The first meeting of the nine-member Legislative Council and sixteen-member Legislative Assembly took place at Newark (now Niagara-on-the-Lake) on 17 September 1792.

Following Simcoe's work precipitated by the Chloe Cooley incident, the Assembly passed the Act Against Slavery in 1793, the first legislation to limit slavery in the British Empire; the English colonists of Upper Canada took pride in this distinction with respect to the French-Canadian populace of Lower Canada. The Upper Canadians valued their common law legal system, as opposed to the civil law of Quebec, which had chafed them ever since 1763. This was one of the primary reasons for the partition of 1791. Simcoe collaborated extensively with his Attorney-General John White on the file.

However, this Act did not free anybody directly, and slaves continued to be held across Upper Canada. The Crown abolished slavery throughout the British Empire, including Upper Canada, in 1834.

Simcoe's priority was the Northwest Indian War between the United States and the "Western Confederacy" of Native Americans west of the Appalachian Mountains and south of the Great Lakes (the Shawnee, Miami, Wyandot, and other tribes). This conflict had begun in 1785, and was still raging when Simcoe arrived in 1792.  Simcoe had hoped to form an Indian buffer state between the two countries, even though he distrusted Joseph Brant, the main Indian leader. Simcoe rejected the section of the Treaty of Paris (1783) which awarded that area to the US, on the grounds that American actions had nullified the treaty. However, the French Revolutionary Wars broke out in 1793. The government in London decided to seek good terms with the United States. Simcoe was instructed to avoid giving the US reason to mistrust Britain but, at the same time, to keep the Natives on both sides of the border friendly to Britain. The Indians asked for British military support, which was initially refused, but in 1794 Britain supplied the Indians with rifles and ammunition.

In February 1794, the governor general, Lord Dorchester, expecting the US to ally with France, said that war was likely to break out between the US and Britain before the year was out. This encouraged the Indians in their war. Dorchester ordered Simcoe to rally the Indians and arm British vessels on the Great Lakes. He also built Fort Miami (present-day Maumee, Ohio) to supply the Indians. Simcoe expelled Americans from a settlement on the southern shore of Lake Erie which had threatened British control of the lake. US President Washington denounced the "irregular and high-handed proceeding of Mr. Simcoe." While Dorchester planned for a defensive war, Simcoe urged London to declare war: "Upper Canada is not to be defended by remaining within the boundary line." Dorchester was officially reprimanded by the Crown for his strong speech against the Americans in 1794.

Simcoe realised that Newark made an unsuitable capital because it was on the Canada–US border and subject to attack. He proposed moving the capital to a more defensible position, in the middle of Upper Canada's southwestern peninsula between Lake Erie and Lake Huron. He named the new location London, and renamed the river there the Thames in anticipation of the change. Dorchester rejected this proposal, but accepted Simcoe's second choice, the present site of Toronto. Simcoe moved the capital there in 1793, and renamed the settlement York after Frederick, Duke of York, King George III's second son.  The town was severely underdeveloped at the time of its founding so he brought with him politicians, builders, Nova Scotia timber men, and Englishmen skilled in whipsawing and cutting joists and rafters.

Simcoe began construction of two roads through Upper Canada, for defence and to encourage settlement and trade. Yonge Street (named after British Minister of War Sir George Yonge) ran north–south from York to Lake Simcoe. Soldiers of the Queen's Rangers began cutting the road in August 1793, reaching Holland Landing in 1796. Dundas Street (named for Colonial Secretary Henry Dundas) ran east–west, between York and London.

The Northwest Indian War ended after the United States defeated the Indians at the Battle of Fallen Timbers. They made peace under the Treaty of Greenville. While still at war with France, Britain could not afford to antagonise the US in the Jay Treaty of 1794, and agreed to withdraw north of the Great Lakes, as agreed in the Treaty of Paris (1783). Simcoe evacuated the frontier forts.

Later career 

In 1794, Simcoe was appointed to the rank of major-general. In July 1796, poor health (gout and neuralgia) forced him to return to Britain. He was unable to return to Upper Canada and resigned his office in 1798.

From October 1796 until March 1797, Simcoe briefly served as the commander of the British expeditionary force which was dispatched to captured the French colony of Saint-Domingue (modern-day Haiti), which was in the midst of a slave rebellion. Henry Dundas, 1st Viscount Melville, who was the Secretary of State for War for prime minister William Pitt the Younger, had instructed Sir Adam Williamson, the lieutenant-governor of Jamaica, to sign an agreement with representatives of the French colonists that promised to restore the ancien regime, slavery and discrimination against mixed-race colonists, a move that drew criticism from abolitionists William Wilberforce and Thomas Clarkson.

After assuming control of the British forces in Saint-Domingue, Simcoe was attacked by Haitian forces under the command of Toussaint Louverture, who at the time was fighting on behalf of the French Republic. An assault on the British-held town of Saint-Marc was repulsed, though Haitian forces captured Mirebalais and the Central Plateau. Simcoe was eventually replaced as leader of the expeditionary force in March.

Simcoe was appointed colonel of the 81st Foot in 1798, but exchanged the position for the 22nd Foot less than six months later. He was also promoted to lieutenant-general and was made commander of the Western District. In 1806, he was appointed Commander-in-Chief, India (to succeed Lord Cornwallis, who had died shortly after arriving in India). Simcoe died in Exeter, England, before assuming the post. Gerard Lake, 1st Viscount Lake, was reappointed to replace Simcoe.

Simcoe was buried in Wolford Chapel on the Simcoe family estate near Honiton, Devon. The Ontario Heritage Foundation acquired title to the chapel in 1982.

Many of Simcoe's personal effects including his sword, sabre, and walking cane, may be viewed by appointment at the Archives of Ontario in Toronto. Elizabeth Simcoe's personal effects and hundreds of her watercolour paintings are also available there.

Legacy 

 In the winter of 1779, the first known Valentine's Day letter in America was given by then Lieutenant Colonel John Simcoe to Sarah 'Sally' Townsend.
 Simcoe Street in Oyster Bay, New York is named after him for his destruction of a vast apple orchard and reconstruction of a hill fort on the site.
 Act Against Slavery passed in 1793, leading to the abolition of slavery in Upper Canada by 1810. It was superseded by the Slavery Abolition Act 1833 that abolished slavery across the British Empire.
 Simcoe named London, Ontario and the River Thames in Upper Canada.
 He named Lake Simcoe and Simcoe County to the west and north of Lake Simcoe in honour of his father.
 Simcoe named his summer home Castle Frank for his first son Francis Gwillim, who was preceded by eight daughters. (It is in what is now named Rosedale, a neighbourhood in downtown Toronto.)
 The Ontario Heritage Foundation placed a plaque in Exeter's cathedral precinct to commemorate his life.
 Simcoe's regiment is still called the Queen's York Rangers, now an armoured reconnaissance regiment of the Canadian Forces reserves.

Many places in Canada were named in honour of Simcoe:
 The town of Simcoe in southwestern Ontario
 The Simcoe Fairgrounds in Simcoe
 Civic Holiday, a statutory holiday celebrated throughout Canada under a variety of names by region, was established in honour of Simcoe by the Toronto City Council in 1869. Other Ontario municipalities and then other provinces soon took up the holiday as well, leading to its Canada-wide status, but without any attribution to Simcoe. In 1965, the Toronto City Council declared the holiday would henceforth be known as Simcoe Day within Toronto. Attempts have been made to have the official provincial name—still Civic Holiday—amended, but none have succeeded.
 Governor Simcoe Secondary School in St. Catharines, Ontario
 Governor Simcoe Public School. Grades K – 8, in London, Ontario. The now closed and demolished school was located at the corner of Simcoe and Clarence Streets.
 Three parallel streets in downtown Toronto, John Street, Graves Street, and Simcoe Street, are all located near the fort where Simcoe lived during his early years in York and were named for him. Graves Street was later renamed Duncan Street.
 Simcoe Street, Simcoe Street United Church, and Simcoe Hall Settlement House in Oshawa.
 Simcoe Street in New Westminster and Simcoe Park was named by Colonel Moody in reference to the surveying of the area after the city of Toronto.
 Simcoe Street, Simcoe Street School and the Simcoe Street School Tigers Bantam Baseball Team of Niagara Falls
 Simcoe Island, located near Kingston, Ontario
 Simcoe Hall, located on the St. George campus of the University of Toronto
 John Graves Simcoe Armoury, located on Industrial Parkway in Aurora, Ontario
 Governors Road, a named section of Ontario Highway 99 running between Dundas, Ontario and Paris, Ontario

There are two places named for Simcoe with the title Lord, but Simcoe was not made a Lord in his lifetime. They are the following:
 Lord Simcoe Drive in Brampton, Ontario
 Lord Simcoe Hotel, which operated from 1956 to 1981

Captain John Kennaway Simcoe, the last member of the Simcoe family, died without issue in 1891 and was survived by his widow beyond 1911.

In popular culture
A fictionalised version of John Graves Simcoe is a primary antagonist in the 2014–2017 AMC drama Turn: Washington's Spies, portrayed by Samuel Roukin. He is portrayed in the series as a cruel and ruthless sociopath.

Despite the strong fictionalisation of the namesake TV-show character, several biographical aspects of the latter's historical counterpart appear to have been adapted for and transferred onto the fictional character Edmund Hewlett. For instance, Hewlett's romantic ambitions regarding Anna Strong in the series resemble Simcoe's courtship of Sarah Townsend, sister of Culper Ring spy Robert Townsend, for whom he wrote a poem that is thought to be the first verifiable valentine on the North American continent. It is presumed that Townsend, much like the fictionalised portrayal of Anna Strong on Turn, may have gathered and passed on intelligence gleaned from her unsuspecting suitor to the Culper Ring.

Similarly, Hewlett's close bond with his horse Bucephalus (presumably named after Bucephalus, the horse of Alexander the Great) which overarches all four seasons, appears to have been inspired by history: in 1783, John Graves Simcoe sent a series of letters to New York in order to find the horse he had ridden on campaign, Salem. Salem was located and Simcoe subsequently paid the considerable sum of £40 to have him shipped to England and thus returned to him. Shortly before his departure to Upper Canada almost a decade later, it is reported he was greatly concerned for Salem's welfare in his absence, therefore making arrangements for the latter's care and upkeep.

Footnotes

Further reading 
 Craig, Gerald M. Upper Canada: the formative years, 1784–1841 (McClelland & Stewart, 1963) ch 2
 Fryer, Mary Beacock, and Christopher Dracott. John Graves Simcoe 1752–1806: A Biography(Dundurn, 1998) online
 Mealing, S. R. "SIMCOE, JOHN GRAVES," in Dictionary of Canadian Biography, vol. 5, University of Toronto/Université Laval, 2003–. Retrieved 6 October 2015, online. 
 Mealing, Stanley Robert. "The Enthusiasms of John Graves Simcoe." Report of the Annual Meeting. Vol. 37. No. 1. The Canadian Historical Association/La Société historique du Canada, 1958. online
 Read, David Breakinridge. The Life and Times of John Graves Simcoe. Toronto: George Virtue, 1890.
 Riddell, William Renwick. The Life of John Graves Simcoe, First Lieutenant-Governor of the Province of Upper Canada, 1792–96 (Toronto: McClelland & Stewart, 1926.)
 Scott, Duncan Campbell. John Graves Simcoe (Toronto: Morang & Company, 1905) online

Primary sources
 Simcoe, John Graves. The correspondence of Lieut. Governor John Graves Simcoe: with allied documents relating to his administration of the government of Upper Canada (2 vol. The Society, 1924)

External links 
 
 Biography at the Dictionary of Canadian Biography Online
 John Graves Simcoe's biography
Massacre at Hancock's Bridge
 Massacre at Hancock's Bridge 2
 The Real Castle Frank (Toronto Star)
Simcoe family fonds, Archives of Ontario

1752 births
1806 deaths
Canadian city founders
British Army generals
35th Regiment of Foot officers
South Lancashire Regiment officers
81st Regiment of Foot officers
Cheshire Regiment officers
British colonial army officers
British Army personnel of the American Revolutionary War
Lieutenant-Governors of Upper Canada
People from Oundle
People educated at Eton College
Military personnel from Northamptonshire
Members of the Parliament of Great Britain for St Mawes
British MPs 1790–1796
Persons of National Historic Significance (Canada)
Alumni of Merton College, Oxford
Burials in Devon
English Freemasons
English abolitionists
Queen's York Rangers (1st American Regiment)